Roger Ellingworth (born 14 December 1962) is a former Australian rules footballer who played in the Victorian Football League during the 1980s.  He played 41 games for Melbourne between 1981 and 1984 and a single game for Hawthorn in 1986. He was recruited from St Peters Junior Football Club in East Bentleigh, Victoria.

References

External links

Profile at Demonwiki
Profile at Hawk Headquarters

Living people
1962 births
Australian rules footballers from Victoria (Australia)
Melbourne Football Club players
Hawthorn Football Club players